In its strictest sense, a flagship is any naval vessel on which a flag officer is embarked. Some navies have permanent flagships, a designation which may be either functional (ships specifically intended for use by a fleet commander) or ceremonial (a fleet's most prestigious vessel due to its age, size, or some special characteristic).

Current permanent flagships

Former permanent flagships

See also
 Royal Navy Fleet Flagship

References

Military lists